Joseph L. Rivet is a Democratic politician from Michigan currently serving as a Bay City Commissioner from Bay City, Michigan's 2nd Ward. He previously served three terms in the Michigan House of Representatives from the 97th and 96th districts between 1999 and 2004. Rivet also served as Bay County Drain Commissioner and supervisor of Bangor Township.

Rivet earned both a bachelor's degree and his M.B.A. at Michigan State University. In addition to his elected offices, he was a legislative aide in the Michigan House and the executive director of the Bay County Convention and Visitors Bureau.

Rivet was ousted as Bay County Drain Commissioner in November of 2020 by Bay County Road Commissioner Michael Rivard, a rematch of a prior election for the same office held in 2012. In December 2022, after a brief break from public office, in December 2022 Rivet was appointed to the Bay City Commission to serve the remainder of his wife's term. He took that office the following month in January of 2023, and represents the 2nd ward in city hall.

References

1965 births
Living people
Democratic Party members of the Michigan House of Representatives
Politicians from Bay City, Michigan
Michigan State University alumni
County officials in Michigan
20th-century American politicians
21st-century American politicians